Craig Thompson (born 1975) is an American graphic novelist.

Craig Thompson may also refer to:
Craig Thompson (soccer) (born 1986), American association football player
Craig B. Thompson (born 1953), American cell biologist
Craig Thompson (American football) (born 1969), NFL player
Craig Thompson (sports administrator) (born 1956), American athletic administrator
Craig Thompson, Northern Irish YouTuber known as Mini Ladd
Craig Thompson Stadium, the stadium of City of Derry R.F.C., named for the YouTuber

See also
Craig Thomson (disambiguation)